Laurence Caruana (born February 16, 1962) is a Maltese artist, writer, and lecturer noted for his contribution to the contemporary visionary art movement, particularly through his Manifesto of Visionary Art.

Biography
Laurence Caruana was born the third son of Maltese parents who met and married in Toronto, Ontario, Canada. After completing his studies in German and ancient Greek Philosophy (B.A. from the University of Toronto 1985), he learned classical painting techniques at the Akademie der Bildenden Künste in Vienna (Academy of Fine Arts Vienna 1990).

Caruana then began an itinerant existence, living variously in Toronto, Malta, Vienna, Munich, Monaco, and Paris. In that period, he actively pursued visionary experience (dreams, entheogens) as a source for his painting and writing. After meeting his French fiançée in Munich, L. Caruana settled in Paris. In the year 2000 he met Ernst Fuchs of the Vienna School of Fantastic Realism and subsequently apprenticed under him for a year, working in his studios in Monaco and Castillon, as well as at the St. Egid chapel in Klagenfurt.

In 2008 he held the first Visions in the Mischtechnik painting seminar in the eco-village of Torri Superiore Italy, which eventually led to the creation of The Vienna Academy of Visionary Art, where Caruana has served as Director and Principal Lecturer since 2013. While still maintaining a studio in the Bastille area of Paris, the artist currently lives in the Josefstadt district of Vienna - frequently traveling abroad to exhibit, teach or lecture on visionary art.

Painting
After apprenticing with Ernst Fuchs, Caruana began using the Mischtechnik, a painting technique which alternates between glazes of oil color (mixed in an oleo-resinous medium) and water-based whites (mixed in egg tempera or casein).

His art is highly mythological. Through fine lines, strong colors and precise rendering, Caruana's work manifests the imagery typical of visionary experience. More uniquely, his work combines symbols and styles from different cultural mythologies.

He has exhibited his works in London, Paris, Vienna, Munich, Monaco, and other cities, both individually (Le Pouvoir des Mythes in Galerie d'Art Visionnaire de Paris) and as part of various groups (Chimeria in France, Society for Art of Imagination in England). Giclée reproductions of his work have frequently appeared at transformational festivals such as The Boom Festival in Portugal and the O.Z.O.R.A. festival in Hungary.

The artist's images have also been reproduced on album covers, in magazines, as tattoos, trading cards, and in posters for transformational festivals.

Writing
L. Caruana's creative and critical writing are extensions of his interest in mythology and visionary art.

Creative writing
In a novel such as The Hidden Passion (Recluse 2007 ), the author has retold the tale of Christ from the Gnostic perspective. Though condemned by the early church as a heresy, Gnosticism expands Christian myth by incorporating motifs from other cultures, such as ancient Greece (Platonism) and Egypt (Hermeticism). Throughout the novel, Christ utters the actual sayings (logia) of the Gnostic gospels found at Nag Hammadi Egypt. L. Caruana's interest in Gnosticism forms part of a much broader fascination with crossing myths from different cultural mythologies.

Critical writing
Due to his deep involvement with the Visionary art movement, L. Caruana has also become one of its spokesmen. Through his on-line Visionary Revue, he has documented the history and evolution of this international movement. His First Manifesto of Visionary Art (Recluse 2010 , English, French and Portuguese editions) was published on-line and in print to an enthusiastic response. The creative essays Myrette and A Mirror Delirious, which appear in issue 4, bring up to date all the author’s thoughts and insights into Visionary art since the publication of the Manifesto.

Caruana's lifelong pursuit of 'the ancient image-language' reached fruition in a book entitled Enter Through the Image: The Ancient Image-Language of Myth, Art and Dreams (Recluse 2008 ). Drawing upon examples from sacred and visionary art, the book demonstrates how we may 'think through images' and eventually enter through the image to the mystical experience of henosis. In its elaboration of the image-language, the book delineates how various myths may cross one another and how different cultural symbols may be combined.

Teaching
Since 2008, Caruana has held The Visions in the Mischtechnik painting seminar in the eco-village of Torri Superiore Italy, co-teaching with Amanda Sage, A. Andrew Gonzalez and others. He has also taught painting at the Omega Institute for Holistic Studies and The Chapel of Sacred Mirrors in New York. In 2013 he co-founded The Vienna Academy of Visionary Art which "revives classical techniques of painting while pursuing art as the expression of beauty, spirit and vision."

Lectures
From his studio in The Vienna Academy of Visionary Art, L. Caruana often travels abroad to deliver lectures on visionary art. He has spoken at such venues as the École des Hautes Études en Sciences Sociales in Paris, the Metageum conference in Malta, and Alex Grey's The Chapel of Sacred Mirrors in New York.

Publications

By L. Caruana

The Hidden Passion: A Novel of the Gnostic Christ, Based on the Nag Hammadi Texts (Recluse 2007).
Enter Through the Image: The Ancient Image-Language of Myth, Art and Dreams (Recluse 2008).
The First Manifesto of Visionary Art (Recluse 2010,  - English, French and Portuguese editions).
Fragments: The First Accumulation of Works (Recluse 1989 - a limited edition of 25 copies).

On (or including) L. Caruana
Erik Davis, The New Eye: Visionary Art and Tradition, Introduction to True Visions (Betty Books, 2006 ), which first appeared in the COSM Journal of Visionary Culture, volume IV (COSM Press, 2006).
 José Eliézer Mikosz, Arte Visionária - Representações Visuais Inspiradas nos Estados não Ordinários de Consciência (ENOC) (Editora Prismas 2014 ).
Metamorphosis, 50 Contemporary Surreal, Fantastic and Visionary Artists edited by Jon Beinart (Beinart Publishing 2007 )
Silvia Thyssen, Boundaries in Question : Examining Visionary Art, Erowid Extracts: Psychoactive Plants and Chemicals, May 2003.
COSM Journal of Visionary Culture, volume V (COSM Press, 2008)
La Mort Transfigurée: L'Art Visionnaire et la Mort (Galerie l'Arche de Morphée, 2006)
Dalis Erben malen Europa, edited by Roger M. Erasmy (Kastner Verlag, 2005)

External links
 L. Caruana main site
 Video on The Visionary Art of L. Caruana: Life as a Gradual Unfolding of the Sacred.
 The Vienna Academy of Visionary Art main site
 Video on The Vienna Academy of Visionary Art.
 Visionary Revue edited by L. Caruana.
 The Gnostic Q featuring The Hidden Passion.
 Podcast interview by Erik Davis on Expanding Mind about Visionary Art and L. Caruana's book Enter Through the Image.
 Podcast interview by Miguel Conner on Aeon Byte Gnostic Radio about L. Caruana's book Enter Through the Image and Secret Rituals in Gnostic Myth.
 Article  on Visionary Art (with reference to L. Caruana). Silvia Thyssen, Boundaries in Question : Examining Visionary Art, Erowid Extract, May 2003.
 Article on Visionary Art (with reference to L. Caruana).  Erik Davis, The New Eye: Visionary Art and Tradition, Introduction to True Visions (Betty Books, 2006 ), which first appeared in the COSM Journal, issue 4.

References

Living people
French artists
French contemporary painters
Psychedelic artists
Gnosticism
Psychedelic drug advocates
Visionary artists
1962 births
Academy of Fine Arts Vienna alumni